This is a list of airlines currently operating in Qatar.

Scheduled airlines

Charter airlines

Cargo airlines

Government airlines

See also
 List of airlines
 List of defunct airlines of State of Qatar
 List of defunct airlines of Asia

Airlines
Qatar
Airlines
Qatar